Diadegma californicum is a wasp first described by G.S. Walley in 1967.
No subspecies are listed.

References

californicum
Insects described in 1967